MWA may refer to: 

 Machas with Attitude, Indian hip hop group
 Mandatory Work Activity, UK
 Married Women's Association, UK
 May Week Alternative, a Cambridge University student charity
 Metropolitan Waterfront Alliance, for the NY-NJ waterfront, USA
 Modern Woodmen of America
 Murchison Widefield Array, radio astronomy array, Australia
 Muslim Women's Association, Australia
 Mystery Writers of America
 Modern Standard Arabic
 Veterans Airport of Southern Illinois near Marion, US, FAA code MWA

See also
 MW (disambiguation)